Otto Rank (né Rosenfeld; 22 April 1884 – 31 October 1939) was an Austrian psychoanalyst, writer, and philosopher. Born in Vienna, he was one of Sigmund Freud's closest colleagues for 20 years, a prolific writer on psychoanalytic themes, editor of the two leading analytic journals of the era, managing director of Freud's publishing house, and a creative theorist and therapist. In 1926, Rank left Vienna for Paris and, for the remainder of his life, led a successful career as a lecturer, writer, and therapist in France and the United States.

In the Vienna Psychoanalytic Society 
In 1905, at the age of 21, Otto Rank presented Freud with a study that so impressed Freud he invited Rank to become Secretary of the emerging Vienna Psychoanalytic Society. Rank thus became the first paid member of the psychoanalytic movement, and Freud's "right-hand man" for almost 20 years. Freud considered Rank, with whom he was more intimate intellectually than his own sons, to be the most brilliant of his Viennese disciples.

Encouraged and supported by Freud, Rank completed the "Gymnasium" or college-preparatory high school, attended the University of Vienna, and was awarded his PhD in literature in 1912. His thesis, on the Lohengrin saga, was published in 1911, the first Freudian doctoral dissertation to be published as a book.

Rank was one of Freud's six collaborators brought together in a secret "committee" or "ring" to defend the psychoanalytic mainstream as disputes with Alfred Adler and Carl Jung developed. Rank was the most prolific author in the "ring" besides Freud himself, extending psychoanalytic theory to the study of legend, myth, art, creativity and   The Double ("Doppelgänger"). He worked closely with Freud, contributing two chapters on myth and legend to The Interpretation of Dreams. Rank's name appeared underneath Freud's on the title page of Freud's greatest work from 1914 until 1930. Between 1915 and 1918, Rank served as Secretary of the International Psychoanalytical Association which Freud had founded in 1910. Everyone in the small psychoanalytic world understood how much Freud respected Rank and his prolific creativity in expanding psychoanalytic theory. Freud announced to the inner circle, full of jealous rivals, that Rank was "my heir" (Lieberman and Kramer, 2012, p. 225).

In 1924, Rank published Das Trauma der Geburt (translated into English as The Trauma of Birth in 1929), exploring how art, myth, religion, philosophy and therapy were illuminated by separation anxiety in the "phase before the development of the Oedipus complex" (p. 216). But there was no such phase in Freud's theories (Kramer, 2019). The Oedipus complex, Freud explained, was the nucleus of the neurosis and the foundational source of all art, myth, religion, philosophy, therapy – indeed of all human culture and civilization. It was the first time that anyone in the inner circle had dared to suggest that the Oedipus complex might not be the supreme causal factor in psychoanalysis. Rank coined the term "pre-Oedipal" in a public psychoanalytic forum in 1925 (Rank, 1996, p. 43). In a 1930 self-analysis of his own writings, Rank observes that "the pre-Oedipal super-ego has since been overemphasized by Melanie Klein, without any reference to me" (ibid., p. 149n).

After some hesitation, Freud distanced himself from The Trauma of Birth, signalling to other members of his inner circle that Rank was perilously close to anti-Oedipal heresy. "I am boiling with rage," Freud told Sándor Ferenczi, then Rank's best friend (Kramer, 2015). Confronted with Freud's decisive opposition, Rank resigned in protest from his positions as Vice-President of the Vienna Psychoanalytic Society, director of Freud's publishing house, and co-editor of Imago and Zeitschrift. Ferenczi, with whom Rank had collaborated from 1920 through 1924 on new experiential, object-relational and "here-and-now" approaches to therapy, vacillated on the significance of Rank's pre-Oedipal theory but not on Rank's objections to classical analytic technique.

The recommendation in Freud's technical papers for analysts to be emotionless, according to Ferenczi and Rank (1924), had led to "an unnatural elimination of all human factors in the analysis" (pp. 40–41), and to "a theorizing of experience [Erlebnis]" (p. 41): the feeling experience of the intersubjective relationship, two first-person experiences, within the analytic situation. According to Sandor Rado, an influential analyst in New York who helped found the psychoanalytic center at Columbia University, "The characteristic of that time was a neglect of a human being's emotional life ... Everybody was looking for oral, pregenital, and genital components in motivation. But that some people are happy, others unhappy, some afraid, or full of anger, and some loving and affectionate – read the case histories to find how such differences between people were then absent from the literature." (Roazen & Swerdloff, 1995, pp. 82–83)

All emotional experience by human beings was being reduced by analysis to a derivative, no matter how disguised, of libido. For Freud, emotion was always sexual, derived from a dangerous Id that must be surgically uprooted: "Where Id was [Wo es war]," Freud said famously, "there ego shall be [soll ich werden]" (S.E., 22:80).

"Libido," according to Freud's 1921 work on Group Psychology and the Analysis of the Ego (S.E., 18: 90), "is an expression taken from the theory of the emotions." Emotion is the cause of neurotic disorder. Increases in emotion, according to Freud, are unpleasurable. Cure, for Freud, means analyzing, "working through" and eventually uprooting the emotions of the patient, "like the draining of the Zuyder Zee" (Freud, S.E., 22:80). The analyst makes the unconscious conscious by providing cognitive insight to the patient, thereby subduing the pressing drive for the irrational, for emotions – for the Id – to emerge from the patient's unconscious (Kramer, 2019, pp. 45–48).

In a 1927 lecture, Rank (1996) observes that "surgical therapy is uprooting and isolates the individual emotionally, as it tries to deny the emotional life" (p. 169), the same attack he and Ferenczi had leveled against psychoanalytic practice in their joint work. Reducing all emotional experience—all feeling, loving, thinking, and willing—to sex was one of Freud's biggest mistakes, according to Rank, who first pointed out this confusion in the mid-twenties. Emotions, said Rank, are relationships. Denial of the emotional life leads to denial of the will, the creative life, as well as denial of the interpersonal relationship in the analytic situation (Rank, 1929–31).

For Freud, said Rank in Will Therapy (1929–31), "the emotional life develops from the sexual sphere, therefore his sexualization in reality means emotionalization" (p. 165), two experiences that psychoanalysts continued to conflate for half a century after Freud's death. Psychoanalysis had no theory of emotional experience and, by extension, no theory of emotional intelligence. Weinstein (2001) identified over two dozen articles in the major psychoanalytic journals criticizing the incomplete and confused theory of emotions in psychoanalysis.  comments persisted through to the 1990s" (Weinstein, 2001, p. 40).

"The emotional impoverishment of psychoanalysis," wrote Ernest Becker (1973) in The Denial of Death, which was strongly influenced by Rank's ideas, "must extend also to many analysts themselves and to psychiatrists who come under its ideology. This fact helps explain the terrible deadness of emotion that one experiences in psychiatric settings, the heavy weight of the character armor erected against the world" (p. 195n).

Written privately in 1932, Ferenczi's Clinical Diary identified the "personal causes for the erroneous development of psychoanalysis" (Ferenczi, 1995, p. 184). According to Ferenczi, "… One learned from [Freud] and from his kind of technique various things that made one's life and work more comfortable: the calm, unemotional reserve; the unruffled assurance that one knows better; and the theories, the seeking and finding of the causes of failure in the patient instead of partly in ourselves … and finally the pessimistic view, shared only with a few, that neurotics are a rabble [Gesindel], good only to support us financially and to allow us to learn from their cases: psychoanalysis as a therapy may be worthless" (Ferenczi, 1995, pp. 185–186).

After Freud turned against Rank, Ferenczi publicly rejected The Trauma of Birth, shunning Rank during a chance meeting in 1926 at Penn Station in New York. "He was my best friend and he refused to speak to me," Rank said (Taft, 1958, p. xvi).

Ferenczi's rupture with Rank cut short radical innovations in practice, and left no one in the inner circle who would champion relational, pre-Oedipal or "here-and-now" psychotherapy. Classical psychoanalysis, along the lines of Freud's 1911–15 technical writings, would now be entrenched in training institutes around the world. The attack leveled in 1924 by Ferenczi and Rank on the increasing "fanaticism for interpretation" and the "unnatural elimination of all human factors" from the practice of analysis would be forgotten (Kramer, 2019, p. 19).

Relational, expressive and "here-and-now" therapy would not be acceptable to most members of the American Psychoanalytic Association or the International Psychoanalytic Association for half a century. "[T]hose who had the misfortune to be analyzed by [Rank] were required to undergo a second analysis in order to qualify" for membership in the American Psychoanalytic Association (Lieberman, 1985, p. 293). As far as classical analysis was concerned, Rank was dead.

Post-Vienna life and work 
In May 1926, having made the feeling relationship in the "here-and-now" central to his practice of psychotherapy, Rank moved to Paris where he became a psychotherapist for artists such as Henry Miller and Anaïs Nin and lectured at the Sorbonne (Lieberman, 1985).

Nin was transformed by her therapy with Rank. On her second visit to Rank, she reflects on her desire to be "re-born," feelingly, as a woman and artist. Rank, she observes, helped her move back and forth between what she could verbalize in her journals and what remained unarticulated. She discovered the quality and depth of her feelings in the wordless transitions between what she could say and what she could not say. "As he talked, I thought of my difficulties with writing, my struggles to articulate feelings not easily expressed. Of my struggles to find a language for intuition, feeling, instincts which are, in themselves, elusive, subtle, and wordless" (Nin, 1966, p. 276).

According to Rank, all feelings are grounded in the present. In Will Therapy, published in German in 1929–31, Rank uses the term "here and now" for the first time in the psychotherapeutic literature: "Freud made the repression historical, that is, misplaced it into the childhood of the individual and then wanted to release it from there, while as a matter of fact the same tendency is working here and now" (Rank, 1929–31, p. 39). Instead of the word Verdrängung (repression), which laid stress on unconscious repression of the past, Rank preferred to use the word Verleugnung (denial), which focused instead on the emotional will to remain ill in the present: "The neurotic lives too much in the past [and] to that extent he actually does not live. He suffers … because he clings to [the past], wants to cling to it, in order to protect himself from experience [Erlebnis], the emotional surrender to the present" (Rank, 1929–31, p. 27).

In France and later in America, Rank enjoyed great success as a therapist and writer from 1926 to 1939. Traveling frequently between France and America, Rank lectured at universities such as Harvard, Yale, Stanford, and University of Pennsylvania on relational, experiential and "here-and-now" psychotherapy, art, the creative will, and "neurosis as a failure in creativity" (Rank, 1996).

Just as Erik Erikson was the first analyst to focus on identity and adulthood, Rank was the first to propose that separation from outworn thoughts, feelings and behaviors is the quintessence of psychological growth and development. In the late 1920s, after he left Freud's inner circle, Rank explored how human beings can learn to assert their will within relationships, and advocated a maximum degree of individuation (or "difference") within a maximum degree of connectedness (or "likeness"). Human beings need to experience both separation and union, without endlessly vacillating between the two poles (Kramer, 2019, p. 75-81).

Foreshadowing the central themes of Piaget, Kohlberg, McClelland, Erikson and Robert Kegan, Rank was the first to propose that human development is a lifelong construction, which requires continual negotiation and renegotiation of the dual yearnings for individuation and connection, the will to separate and the will to unite. Decades before Ronald Fairbairn, now credited by many as the inventor in the 1940s of modern object-relations theory, Rank's 1926 lecture on "The Genesis of the Object Relation" marks the first complete statement of this theory (Rank, 1996, pp. 140–149). By 1926 Rank was persona non grata in the official psychoanalytic world. There is little reason to believe, therefore, that any of the other writers credited with helping to invent object relations theory (Melanie Klein or Donald Winnicott, for example) ever read the German text of this lecture, published as Zur Genese der Object-beziehung in Vol. 1 of Rank's Genetische Psychologie (1927, pp. 110–22).

Rank died in New York City in 1939 from a kidney infection, one month after Freud's physician-assisted suicide on the Jewish Day of Atonement. "Komisch" (strange, odd, comical), Rank said on his deathbed (Lieberman, 1985, p. 389).

Influence 
Rollo May, a pioneer of existential psychotherapy in the United States, was deeply influenced by Rank's post-Freudian lectures and writings and always considered Rank to be the most important precursor of existential therapy. Shortly before his death, Rollo May wrote the foreword to Robert Kramer's edited collection of Rank's American lectures. "I have long considered Otto Rank to be the great unacknowledged genius in Freud's circle," said May (Rank, 1996, p. xi).

In 1924, Jessie Taft, an early feminist philosopher, social worker, and student of George H. Mead, met Otto Rank. After becoming his patient, she was inspired to develop "relationship therapy" and eventually, the "functional model of social work" at the Pennsylvania School of Social Work, both explicitly based on Rank's ideas. Taft (1958) wrote the first biography of Rank and had a profound understanding of his thinking on how the creative will emerges from the empathic relationship between client and social worker (Kramer, 2019, pp. 38–41).

In addition, it was Jessie Taft and Frederick Allen's work at the Philadelphia Child Guidance Clinic that introduced Carl Rogers, then a psychologist in the Child Study Department of the Rochester Society for the Prevention of Cruelty Children, to "relationship therapy" as the practical application of Rank's ideas.

In 1936 Carl Rogers, influenced by social workers on his staff trained at the University of Pennsylvania School of Social Work, invited Otto Rank to give a series of lectures in New York on Rank's post-Freudian models of experiential and relational therapy. Rogers was transformed by these lectures and always credited Rank with having profoundly shaped "client-centered" therapy and the entire profession of counseling. "I became infected with Rankian ideas," said Rogers (Kramer, 2019).

The New York writer Paul Goodman, who was co-founder with Fritz Perls of the Gestalt method of psychotherapy that makes Otto Rank's "here-and-now" central to its approach, described Rank's post-Freudian ideas on art and creativity as "beyond praise" in Gestalt Therapy (Perls, Goodman and Hefferline, 1951, p. 395). Erving Polster, another well-known Gestalt therapist, was also strongly influenced by Rank's practice of focusing on the "here-and-now": "Rank brought the human relationship directly into his office. He influenced analysts to take seriously the actual present interaction between therapist and patient, rather than maintain the fixed, distant, 'as though' relationship that had given previous analysts an emotional buffer for examining the intensities of therapeutic sensation and wish. Rank's contributions opened the way for encounter to become accepted as a deep therapeutic agent" (Polster, 1968, p. 6).

Rank also affected the practice of action-oriented and reflective therapies such as dramatic role-playing and psychodrama. "Although there is no evidence of a direct influence, Rank's ideas found new life in the work of such action psychotherapists as Moreno, who developed a psychodrama technique of doubling ... and Landy [director of the drama therapy program at New York University], who attempted to conceptualize balance as an integration of role and counterrole" (Landy, 2008, p. 29).

Summary of main ideas 
Rank was the first to see therapy as a learning and unlearning experience focusing on feelings. The therapeutic relationship allows the patient to: (1) learn more creative ways of thinking, feeling and being in the here-and-now; and (2) unlearn self-destructive ways of thinking, feeling and being in the here-and-now. Patterns of self-destruction ("neurosis") represent a failure of creativity and not, as Freud assumed, a retreat from sexuality.

Rank's psychology of creativity has recently been applied to action learning, an inquiry-based process of group problem solving, team building, leader development and organizational learning (Kramer 2007; 2008). Transformative action learning, synthesized by Robert Kramer from Rank's writings on art and spirituality, involves real people, working on real problems in real time. Once a safe container is created by a learning coach, questions allow group members to "step out of the frame of the prevailing ideology," as Rank wrote in Art and Artist (1932/1989, p. 70), reflect on their assumptions and beliefs, and reframe their choices. The process of "stepping out" of a frame, out of a form of knowing – a prevailing ideology – is analogous to the work of artists as they struggle to give birth to fresh ways of seeing the world, perspectives that allow them to see aspects of the world that no artists, including themselves, have ever seen before. The heart of transformative action learning, as developed by Kramer, is asking powerful questions to promote the unlearning or letting go of taken-for-granted assumptions and beliefs.

The most creative artists, such as Rembrandt, Michelangelo and Leonardo, know how to separate even from their own greatest public successes, from earlier artistic incarnations of themselves. Their "greatness consists precisely in this reaching out beyond themselves, beyond the ideology which they have themselves fostered," according to Art and Artist (Rank, 1932/1989, p. 368). Through the lens of Otto Rank's work on understanding art and artists, transformative action learning can be seen as the never-completed process of learning how to "step out of the frame" of any mindset, whether one's own or the culture's – in other words, of learning how to unlearn. (Kramer, 2012).

Comparing the process of unlearning to the "breaking out" process of birth, Rank was the first psychologist to suggest that a continual capacity to separate from "internal mental objects" – from internalized institutions, beliefs and neuroses; from the restrictions of culture, social conformity and received wisdom – is the sine qua non for lifelong creativity.

In a 1938 lecture at the University of Minnesota, Rank said: "Life in itself is a mere succession of separations. Beginning with birth, going through several weaning periods and the development of the individual personality, and finally culminating in death – which represents the final separation. At birth, the individual experiences the first shock of separation, which throughout his life he strives to overcome. In the process of adaptation, man persistently separates from his old self, or at least from those segments off his old self that are now outlived. Like a child who has outgrown a toy, he discards the old parts of himself for which he has no further use ….The ego continually breaks away from its worn-out parts, which were of value in the past but have no value in the present. The neurotic [who cannot unlearn, and, therefore, lacks creativity] is unable to accomplish this normal detachment process … Owing to fear and guilt generated in the assertion of his own autonomy, he is unable to free himself, and instead remains suspended upon some primitive level of his evolution" (Rank, 1996, p. 270).

Reframing "resistance" as a creative function, not as opposition to interpretations offered by the psychoanalyst, Rank defined counterwill in the therapeutic relationship as a positive trait that defends the integrity of the self and helps in individuation, unlearning and the discovery of willing.

Unlearning necessarily involves separation from one's self-concept, as it has been culturally conditioned to conform to familial, group, occupational or organizational allegiances. According to Rank (1932/1989), unlearning or breaking out of our shell from the inside is "a separation [that] is so hard, not only because it involves persons and ideas that one reveres, but because the victory is always, at bottom, and in some form, won over a part of one's ego" (p. 375).

In the organizational context, learning how to unlearn is vital because what we assume to be true has merged into our identity. We refer to the identity of an individual as a "mindset." We refer to the identity of an organizational group as a "culture." Action learners learn how to question, probe and separate from, both kinds of identity—i.e., their "individual" selves and their "social" selves. By opening themselves to critical inquiry, they begin to learn how to emancipate themselves from what they "know" – they learn how to unlearn.

In 1974, the cultural anthropologist Ernest Becker won the Pulitzer prize for The Denial of Death (1973), which was based on Rank's post-Freudian writings, especially Will Therapy (1929–31), Psychology and the Soul (1930) and Art and Artist (1932/1989). Becker's posthumously published book, Escape from Evil (1975) was devoted in large measure to exploring Rank's social psychology rooted in the idea of history as a succession of immortality ideologies. A revised edition of Escape from Evil, keeping its central message but shifting its tone from a darkly intellectual analysis to a more hopeful Rankian relational approach of mutual love in order to transcend the fear of life and the fear of death, is now in preparation by Marie Becker and Robert Kramer.

Through the influence of Ernest Becker's writings, Rank's dialectic between "life fear and death fear" has been tested experimentally in Terror Management Theory by Skidmore College psychology professor Sheldon Solomon, University of Arizona psychology professor Jeff Greenberg, and University of Colorado at Colorado Springs psychology professor Tom Pyszczynski.

The American priest and theologian, Matthew Fox, founder of Creation Spirituality and Wisdom University, considers Rank to be one of the most important psychologists of the 20th century.

Stanislav Grof, a founder of transpersonal psychology, based much of his work in prenatal and perinatal psychology on Rank's The Trauma of Birth (Kripal, 2007, pp. 249–269).

In 2008, the philosopher Maxine Sheets-Johnstone published The Roots of Morality (Pennsylvania State University Press). She compares Rank's thought favorably to that of René Descartes, Martin Heidegger and Jacques Derrida: "Because immortality ideologies were originally recognized and in fact so named by Rank, a close examination of his writings on the subject is not only apposite but is itself philosophically rewarding ... Rank was a Freudian dissident who, in introducing the concept of immortality ideologies, traced out historical and psychological roots of 'soul-belief' (Seelenglaube)... [My chapter] points up the extraordinary cogency of Rank's distinction between the rational and the irrational to the question of the human need for immortality ideologies" (Sheets-Johnstone, 2008, p. 64). Sheets-Johnstone concludes her book on a note reminiscent of Rank's plea for the human value of mutual love over arid intellectual insight: "Surely it is time for Homo sapiens sapiens to turn away from the pursuit of domination over all and to begin cultivating and developing its sapiential wisdom in the pursuit of caring, nurturing and strengthening that most precious muscle which is its heart" (ibid., pp. 405–06).

Major publications 
By date of first publication

Notes

References 
Correspondence
 Lieberman, E. James and Robert Kramer (eds.) (2012). The Letters of Sigmund Freud and Otto Rank: Inside Psychoanalysis. Baltimore: Johns Hopkins University Press. https://www.amazon.com/Letters-Sigmund-Freud-Otto-Rank/dp/1421403544 German ed. "Sigmund Freud und Otto Rank" 2014; French ed., 2015.

Book-length works about Otto Rank.
 Costa, Julio Roberto (2014). To Be More Person: a Reading of Otto Rank. Amazon Digital Services, Inc. .
 Karpf, Fay Berger (1970). The Psychology and Psychotherapy of Otto Rank: An Historical and Comparative Introduction. Westport, Connecticut: Greenwood Press. .
 Kramer, Robert (2019). The Birth of Relationship Therapy: Carl Rogers Meets Otto Rank. Giessen, Germany: Psychosozial-Verlag. .
 Lieberman, E. James (1985). Acts of Will: The Life and Work of Otto Rank. Free Press. . Updated ed. University of Massachusetts Press, 1993. French translation: La volonté en acte: La vie et l'œvre d'Otto Rank PUF (1991) ; German translation Otto Rank: Leben und Werk Psychosozial (1997) 
 Menaker, Esther (1982). Otto Rank: A Rediscovered Legacy. Columbia University Press.
 Taft, Jessie (1958). Otto Rank: A Biographical Study Based on Notebooks, Letters, Collected Writings, Therapeutic Achievements and Personal Associations. New York: The Julian Press.

Master's thesis on Rank.

Journal series on Rank.
 Journal of the Otto Rank Association Vols. 1 – 17, 31 issues, 1967–1983, diverse writers, including Otto Rank.

Articles or chapters about Otto Rank.
 Kramer, Robert (2015). 'I am Boiling with Rage': Why Did Freud Banish Rank?, an article in Psychoanalyse im Widerspruch, Volume 53, pp. 31–43.
 Kramer, Robert (2012). Otto Rank on Emotional Intelligence, Unlearning and Self-Leadership. American Journal of Psychoanalysis,  Volume 72, pp. 326–351.
 Kramer, Robert (2006). Otto Rank. Edinburgh International Encyclopedia of Psychoanalysis, Ross Skelton (ed.) Edinburgh University Press), p. 389.
 Kramer, Robert (2003). Why Did Ferenczi and Rank Conclude that Freud Had No More Emotional Intelligence than a Pre-Oedipal Child? In Creative Dissent: Psychoanalysis in Evolution, Claude Barbre, Barry Ulanov, and Alan Roland (eds.), Praeger, Ch.3, pp. 23–36.
 Kramer, Robert (1995). The Birth of Client-Centered Therapy: Carl Rogers, Otto Rank, and 'The Beyond,' an article in Journal of Humanistic Psychology, Volume 35, pp. 54–110.
 Kramer, Robert (1995). The 'Bad Mother' Freud Has Never Seen: Otto Rank and the Birth of Object-Relations Theory, an article in Journal of the American Academy of Psychoanalysis, Volume 23, pp. 293–321.
 Landy, Robert J. (2008). The Couch and the Stage: Integrating Words and Action in Psychotherapy. Lanham: Jason Aronson, pp. 23–33.
 Lieberman, E. James. (2003) The Evolution of Psychotherapy Since Freud. In Creative Dissent: Psychoanalysis in Evolution, Claude Barbre, Barry Ulanov, and Alan Roland (eds.), Praeger, Ch. 4, pp. 37–44.
 Roazen, Paul and Bluma Swerdloff (eds.) (1995). Heresy: Sandor Rado and the Psychoanalytic Movement. New Jersey: Jason Aronson.
 Sheets-Johnstone, Maxine (2008). The Roots of Morality. University Park: Pennsylvania State University Press, pp. 63–91.

Diary of Sándor Ferenczi.
 The Clinical Diary of Sándor Ferenczi (1988), Editor Judith Dupont, Translator Michael Balint and Nicola Zarday Jackson, Harvard University Press.

Articles or chapters on application of Rank's psychology of art to transformative action learning, leader development and organizational learning.
 Kramer, Robert (2003). Management and Organization Development Through the Lens of Otto Rank and Carl Rogers, Internationale Zeitschrift fűr Sozialpsychologie und Gruppendynamik [Vienna, Austria], Vol. 28, pp. 26–43. (In English.)
 Kramer, Robert (2007). How Might Action Learning Be Used to Develop the Emotional Intelligence and Leadership Capacity of Public Administrators? Journal of Public Affairs Education,13 (2), pp. 205–246.
 Kramer, Robert (2008). Learning How to Learn: Action Learning for Leadership Development. A chapter in Rick Morse (ed.) Innovations in Public Leadership Development. Washington DC: M.E. Sharpe and National Academy of Public Administration, pp. 296–326.
 Kramer, Robert and James Kelly (2010). Transformative Action Learning in the U.S. Government. A chapter in Yuri Boshyk and Robert Dilworth (eds.), Action Learning and Its Applications. New York: Palgrave Macmillan, pp. 43–54.
 Kramer, Robert (2012). Otto Rank on Emotional Intelligence, Unlearning and Self-Leadership. American Journal of Psychoanalysis. Volume 72, pp. 326–351.
 Kramer, Robert (2016). From Skillset to Mindset: A New Paradigm for Leader Development. Public Administration Issues, Number 5, pp. 125–142.

Other references.
 Becker, Ernest (1973). The Denial of Death. New York: The Free Press.
 Becker, Ernest (1975). Escape from Evil. New York: The Free Press.
 Kripal, Jeffrey J. (2007). Esalen: America and the Religion of No Religion. Chicago: University of Chicago Press.
 Nin, Anais (1966). The diary of Anaïs Nin: 1931–1934, Volume 1.New York: Houghton Mifflin Harcourt.
 Weinstein, Fred (2001). Freud, Psychoanalysis, Social Theory: The Unfulfilled Promise. Albany: State University of New York Press.
 Polster, Erving (1968). A Contemporary Psychotherapy. In Paul David Pursglove (ed.) Recognitions in Gestalt Therapy New York: Funk & Wagnalls.

External links 

 OttoRank.com
 The Ernest Becker Foundation
 International Psychoanalytical Association
 
 
 
 The Myth of the Birth of the Hero, at sacred-texts.com
 The myth of the birth of the hero: a psychological interpretation of mythology. English translation by Drs. F. Robbins and Smith Ely Jelliffe, 1914. archive.org.
 The Philosophical Underpinnings of the Work of Otto Rank, at http://juliorobertocosta.com/
 Essays on Otto Rank's Book Art and Artist
Otto Rank papers, 1912-1936 held at the University of Pennsylvania: University Archives and Records Center

Freudians
Narcissism writers
Jewish emigrants from Austria after the Anschluss
1884 births
1939 deaths
Existential therapists
Psychoanalysts from Vienna
Analysands of Sigmund Freud
Object relations theorists
Jewish psychoanalysts
Members of the Vienna Psychoanalytic Society